Joseph Peter "Smokey" Lotz (January 2, 1891 – January 1, 1971) was a pitcher in Major League Baseball. He played for the St. Louis Cardinals in 1916. He attended Creighton University.

References

External links

1891 births
1971 deaths
Major League Baseball pitchers
St. Louis Cardinals players
Baseball players from Iowa
Omaha Rourkes players
Kearney Kapitalists players
Oshkosh Indians players
Seattle Giants players
Rochester Hustlers players
Sioux City Packers players